Artroeite (PbAlF3(OH)2) is a mineral found in Arizona. It is named for the late American chemist Arthur Roe (1912–1993).

References 

Mindat.org - Artroeite
Webmineral.com - Artroeite
Handbook of Mineralogy - Artroeite

Lead minerals
Fluorine minerals
Triclinic minerals
Minerals in space group 2